Przydonica  is a village in the administrative district of Gmina Gródek nad Dunajcem, within Nowy Sącz County, Lesser Poland Voivodeship, in southern Poland. Not to be confused with the nearby and more populous, Przydonica-Glinik

Church
The parish church dates back to the sixteenth century, and houses Our Lady of Przydonica, one of three such. King John III Sobieski proclaimed a miracle when he saw a vision of the Virgin Mary after a 1683 military victory in Vienna against the Turks.

Commerce
The village hosts a sawmill and a general merchandise market

References

External links 

 School of Przydonica
 Sanctuary of Our Lady of Przydonica
 Polish Madonnas

Przydonica